Liverpool Abercromby or Abercromby (Liverpool) was a constituency represented in the House of Commons of the Parliament of the United Kingdom. It was created by the Redistribution of Seats Act 1885 for the 1885 general election and returned one Member of Parliament (MP) by the first past the post system until it was abolished at the 1918 general election.

Boundaries
The Municipal Borough of Liverpool wards of Abercromby, Castle Street, Great George's, Pitt Street, Rodney Street, and St Peter's.

Members of Parliament

Elections

Elections in the 1880s

Elections in the 1890s

Elections in the 1900s

Elections in the 1910s

References

Abercromby
Parliamentary constituencies in North West England (historic)
Constituencies of the Parliament of the United Kingdom established in 1885
Constituencies of the Parliament of the United Kingdom disestablished in 1918